RPO "Rys"  (Russian: реактивный пехотный огнемёт «Рысь» (РПО «Рысь»), Rocket-propelled Infantry Flamethrower "Lynx") is a napalm rocket-propelled grenade launcher classified as flamethrower by Russian military. The RPO had first entered service in 1975 and it was intended to replace the obsolete LPO-50 flamethrowers. Later it was replaced by the RPO-A Shmel.

Description 
The RPO Rys shares some parts with RPG-16, like the firing mechanism. It also resembles RPG-29 and can be mistaken for it. The weapon is breech loaded with capsuled, solid propellant, napalm filled rockets. The rockets are filled with 4 liters of napalm and have muzzle velocity of around 125 m/s with effective range of 190 meters. The RPO also has a bipod for stability and maximum sighting range of 400 meters.

See also
RPO-A Shmel: Thermobaric grenade launcher / flamethrower
MGK Bur: Miniaturized thermobaric grenade launcher / flamethrower

Users

References

Rocket-propelled grenade launchers
Modern incendiary weapons of Russia
Flamethrowers of the Soviet Union
Military equipment introduced in the 1970s